Iver railway station is situated in the village of Richings Park, within Iver, Buckinghamshire, England. Services at the station are operated by the Elizabeth line

In preparation for the introduction of Elizabeth line services, the operation of the station was transferred to MTR Crossrail on behalf of Transport for London at the end of 2017.

History
The station is on the original line of the Great Western Railway which opened on 4 June 1838, however no station was provided at Iver until 1924; Iver station opened on 1 December that year.

This section of line is also where the first trials of the locomotive North Star were held, commemorated by a public house in nearby Thorney.
William Stallybrass, Principal of Brasenose College, Oxford and Vice-Chancellor of Oxford University, died in a railway accident when he stepped out of a moving train near the station in 1948. He was almost blind at the time.

The line through Iver was electrified in 2017 in preparation for the Crossrail service, which began operation in December 2019.

As part of ongoing work to prepare the station for the Elizabeth Line, Iver station gained a new station building, with a ticket office, ticket gates and accessible toilet.

Services
The station is served by local services operated by Elizabeth line.

Frequency
The typical off-peak service is: 
 2tph to 

Trains are formed of Class 345 Aventra trains with nine coaches but, due to the short platforms at Iver, doors open only in the first six.

Service table

References

External links

Railway stations in Buckinghamshire
Former Great Western Railway stations
Railway stations in Great Britain opened in 1924
Great Western Main Line
Railway stations served by the Elizabeth line